Vaccinium boreale, common name northern blueberry, sweet hurts, or bleuet boréal (in French), is a plant species native to the northeastern United States and eastern Canada. It has been found in Québec, New Brunswick, Nova Scotia, Newfoundland and Labrador, Maine, New Hampshire, Vermont, and New York State.

Description 
Twigs are green, angled, with lines of hairs.

References

boreale
Flora of Eastern Canada
Flora of the Northeastern United States
Plants described in 1961
Blueberries